Mehmet Hayri Tarhan (1884; Tirnovadjik (Malko Tarnovo) – December 11, 1934; Ankara) was a military officer of the Ottoman Army and a general of the Turkish Army.

See also
List of high-ranking commanders of the Turkish War of Independence

Sources

External links
 
 

1880s births
1934 deaths
People from Malko Tarnovo
Ottoman Military Academy alumni
Ottoman Military College alumni
Ottoman Army officers
Ottoman military personnel of the Balkan Wars
Members of the Special Organization (Ottoman Empire)
Ottoman military personnel of World War I
Turkish military personnel of the Turkish–Armenian War
Recipients of the Medal of Independence with Red Ribbon (Turkey)
Turkish Army generals
Turkish military personnel of the Greco-Turkish War (1919–1922)